Palü Lake (Italian: Lago Palü, Romansh: Lagh da Palü, German Palüsee) is a lake below Piz Palü in the Swiss canton of Graubünden. Water from Palü Glacier feeds into the lake. 

In 1926, a dam was built enabling use of the lake as a reservoir. The nearby  has an installed capacity of 10 MW and is fed by a pressurised pipe-line from Lago Bianco. The  tunnel connecting the two plants also accommodates a funicular railway that is open to the public during tours of the plants.

See also
List of mountain lakes of Switzerland

References

Lakes of Switzerland
Reservoirs in Switzerland
Lakes of Graubünden
Poschiavo